Sigvald Skavlan (27 December 18394 November 1912) was a Norwegian priest, psalmist and educator.

He was born at the vicarage in Stranda in Møre og Romsdal. He was the son of Aage Schavland (1806–1876) and Gerhardine Pauline Bergh (1817–1884). His father was a parish priest and later member of the Storting. After 1844, the family moved to Herøy. He was a brother of Olaf Skavlan, Aage Skavlan and Harald Skavlan, and uncle of Einar Skavlan. 
Skavlan studied theology in Christiania (now Oslo) until 1864. He was one of the first three priests in Antwerp after the Norwegian Seaman's Mission was founded in 1865. In 1887 came to Vår Frue Church in Trondheim where he served until he retired.

He is probably best remembered for his cantatas and psalms. His psalm collection  was published posthumously in 1913. He was decorated Knight, First Class of the Order of St. Olav in 1897.

References

External links

1839 births
1912 deaths
People from Stranda
20th-century Norwegian Lutheran clergy
Norwegian schoolteachers
Norwegian expatriates in Belgium
Royal Norwegian Society of Sciences and Letters
19th-century Norwegian Lutheran clergy